Lê Quang Hùng (born 7 June 1992) is a Vietnamese footballer who played as a full-back for V.League 2 club Phù Đổng.

References

External links

Vietnamese footballers
Association football defenders
1992 births
Living people
People from Haiphong
Vietnam international footballers